Rajab Ali Fakir is a Bangladesh Nationalist Party politician and the former Member of Parliament of Mymensingh-2.

Career
Fakir was elected to parliament from Mymensingh-2 as a Bangladesh Nationalist Party candidate in 1988.

References

Bangladesh Nationalist Party politicians
Living people
4th Jatiya Sangsad members
Year of birth missing (living people)